Camptonville (formerly, Comptonville and Gold Ridge) is a small town and census-designated place (CDP) located in northeastern Yuba County, California. It is located on a ridge between the North Fork and Middle Fork of the Yuba River, not far from New Bullards Bar Dam Reservoir. Camptonville lies at an elevation of 2825 feet (861 m). The population was 158 at the 2010 census.

History

Gold was discovered here in 1850, and the place became known as Gold Ridge. The name was changed to Camptonville in 1854 when the first post office opened. The name honors Robert Campton, the town blacksmith.

It was a significant community in the California Gold Rush era and a stopping point for travelers and freight haulers along Henness Pass Road, a major route over the Sierra Nevada via Henness Pass in the 1850s and 1860s.  A plaque in Camptonville says the roaring town had over fifty saloons had brothels and even a bowling alley at one time.  However, by 1863 William H. Brewer passed through Camptonville and described it in his journal as follows:

September 10 we started on our way--first to Nevada [City], a few miles, a fine town in a rich mining region, then to San Juan North (there are several other San Juans in the state), then to Camptonville, a miserable, dilapidated town, but very picturesquely located, with immense hydraulic diggings about. The amount of soil sluiced away in this way seems incredible. Bluffs sixty to a hundred feet thick have been washed away for hundreds of acres together. But they were not rich, the gold has “stopped,” the town is dilapidated--but we had to pay big prices nevertheless.

As gold mining in the area waned, the local economy depended on the timber industry. When Sierra Mountain Mills closed in 1994 putting 75 people out of work, many people moved away.  Today the town includes the Lost Nugget gas station and convenience store, a post office, Camptonville Elementary School; a monument to the Pelton wheel, the inventor of which lived here in the 1860s; and the original Mayo Saloon, currently home to a restaurant and bar called Burgee Dave's at the Mayo; and the Yuba River Ranger District Office of the Tahoe National Forest, which is also the headquarters of the Tahoe Hotshots fire crew.

Geography
According to the United States Census Bureau, the CDP covers an area of 0.9 square miles (2.3 km), all of it land.

Climate
According to the Köppen Climate Classification system, Camptonville has a warm-summer Mediterranean climate, abbreviated "Csa" on climate maps.

Demographics

The 2010 United States Census reported that Camptonville had a population of 158. The racial makeup of Camptonville was 117 (74.1%) White, 0 (0.0%) African American, 15 (9.5%) Native American, 2 (1.3%) Asian, 0 (0.0%) Pacific Islander, 4 (2.5%) from other races, and 20 (12.7%) from two or more races. Hispanic or Latino of any race were 5 persons (3.2%).

The Census reported that 158 people (100% of the population) lived in households, 0 (0%) lived in non-institutionalized group quarters, and 0 (0%) were institutionalized.

There were 70 households, out of which 22 (31.4%) had children under the age of 18 living in them, 30 (42.9%) were opposite-sex married couples living together, 7 (10.0%) had a female householder with no husband present, 5 (7.1%) had a male householder with no wife present.  There were 8 (11.4%) unmarried opposite-sex partnerships, and 0 (0%) same-sex married couples or partnerships. 24 households (34.3%) were made up of individuals, and 8 (11.4%) had someone living alone who was 65 years of age or older. The average household size was 2.26.  There were 42 families (60.0% of all households); the average family size was 2.86.

The population was spread out, with 36 people (22.8%) under the age of 18, 10 people (6.3%) aged 18 to 24, 36 people (22.8%) aged 25 to 44, 53 people (33.5%) aged 45 to 64, and 23 people (14.6%) who were 65 years of age or older.  The median age was 44.3 years. For every 100 females, there were 102.6 males.  For every 100 females age 18 and over, there were 100.0 males.

The homeowner vacancy rate was 0%; the rental vacancy rate was 8.8%.  86 people (54.4% of the population) lived in owner-occupied housing units and 72 people (45.6%) lived in rental housing units.

References

External links
Camptonville's Community Website
Camptonville Elementary School

Census-designated places in Yuba County, California
Mining communities of the California Gold Rush
Populated places in the Sierra Nevada (United States)
Downieville, California
Populated places established in 1850
1850 establishments in California
Census-designated places in California